Pholistoma auritum is a species of flowering plant in the borage family which is known by the common name blue fiestaflower.

Distribution
It is native to California, southern Nevada, and Arizona, where it can be found in many types of habitat, from mountain talus to coastal bluffs to desert scrub.

Description
Pholistoma auritum is an annual herb with a brittle, fleshy, bristly stem branching profusely, sometimes forming a tangle. The leaves are deeply lobed and toothed and borne on winged petioles. The foliage is coated in hairs and bristles. The inflorescence is made up of one or more widely bell-shaped flowers up to 1.5 centimeters long and 3 wide. The hair-lined flowers are blue to purple with darker markings in the centers.

The purple Arizona fiestaflower, Pholistoma auritum var. arizonicum, is considered a subspecies.

External links

Jepson Manual Treatment - Pholistoma auritum
Pholistoma auritum - Photo gallery

Hydrophylloideae
Flora of California
Flora of Arizona
Flora of the California desert regions
Flora of the Sierra Nevada (United States)
Flora of the Sonoran Deserts
Natural history of the California chaparral and woodlands
Natural history of the California Coast Ranges
Natural history of the Colorado Desert
Natural history of the Peninsular Ranges
Natural history of the San Francisco Bay Area
Natural history of the Santa Monica Mountains
Natural history of the Transverse Ranges
Flora without expected TNC conservation status